The 1999–2000 season was the 95th season in the existence of CD Badajoz and the club's eighth consecutive season in the second division of Spanish football.

Competitions

Overall record

La Liga

League table

Results summary

Results by round

Matches

Source:

Copa del Rey

First round

References

CD Badajoz
Badajoz